Change: The Magazine of Higher Learning is an academic magazine devoted to the study of higher education, described by the Chronicle of Higher Education as a "stalwart of higher education".

History
The magazine was founded in 1970, sponsored by the American Association for Higher Education, published in Washington, D.C. by Heldref Publications. 

By 1979, the magazine was taken over by Heldref Publications.

After the Association ceased operating in 2005, the magazine was sponsored by  the Carnegie Foundation for the Advancement of Teaching until 2016, when its sponsorship was switched to the Council for Higher Education Accreditation.

References

External links
Change: The Magazine of Higher Learning - official site

Bimonthly magazines published in the United States
Education magazines
Magazines established in 1970
Magazines published in Washington, D.C.
Works about academia